Mohammed Noor Al-Deen  (born 6 August 1984) is an Iraqi former football goalkeeper who played for Iraq at the 2006 Asian Games.

Noor Al-Deen played for the national team in 2006.

References

Iraqi footballers
Iraq international footballers
Living people
Association football goalkeepers
1984 births
Asian Games medalists in football
Footballers at the 2006 Asian Games
Asian Games silver medalists for Iraq
Medalists at the 2006 Asian Games